Kuh Kenar (also Romanized as Kūh Kenār; also known as Kūh Ketār) is a village in Shaban Rural District, in the Central District of Meshgin Shahr County, Ardabil Province, Iran. At the 2006 census, its population was 169, in 38 families.

References 

Towns and villages in Meshgin Shahr County